Jean-Francois James is a Haitian footballer who plays as a striker for the Haiti national team.

References

1993 births
Living people
Haiti international footballers
Haitian footballers
Association football forwards
Le Mans FC players